The Bernese Jura Railway (Chemins de fer du Jura bernois, abbreviated Jura bernois, JB) was a railway company in Switzerland. The company was called the Jura–Bern–Luzern (Jura–Bern–Lucerne, JBL) from 1 July 1884. The Jura–Bern–Lucerne merged with the Western Switzerland–Simplon Railways (Suisse-Occidentale–Simplon, SOS) to form the Jura–Simplon Railway (Jura-Simplon-Bahn), JS) on 1 January 1890.

History 

The railway network of the Canton of Bern initially developed according to the interests of the Swiss Central Railway (Schweizerische Centralbahn, SCB). The Grand Council of Bern, decided to conclude a contract with the SCB in 1852. The Central Railway undertook to build the Murgenthal–Bern line and the Solothurn–Herzogenbuchsee railway within four years and in return received tax exemption and the privilege of being given preferential treatment in future grants of concessions to build railways. The Central Railway’s construction now concentrated for a period on the more populated areas in the Swiss Plateau. The rugged and economically less developed Jura had a much more limited railway network. The Central Railway had no interest in competing with its existing Hauenstein Railway.
 
Under the chairmanship of Xavier Stockmar, the Zentralkomitee für die jurassische Eisenbahn (Central Committee for the Jura Railways) planned a railway line from Biel/Bienne to Basel with a branch from Delémont to Porrentruy. Although the concession was granted, it was not built due to lack of funds. To connect the Bernese Jura to the old part of the canton, the Grand Council provided a subsidy of CHF 6,950,000 of the estimated construction cost of CHF 40 million in 1867. The Delémont–Delle railway, which was financed by French companies, was built and handed over for operations on 23 September 1872.

Capital procurement, construction and transfer of track 

A new situation arose in 1871, with the cession of Alsace-Lorraine to Germany after the Franco-Prussian War. A line built across French territory and through the Bernese Jura would connect the Paris–Belfort line directly to the Swiss Plateau. The Jura bernois was founded in 1874 as a joint-stock company, with the French Chemins de fer de l'Est subscribing CHF 4½ million and the canton of Basel-Stadt subscribing CHF 0.5 million. The municipalities and Bürgergemeinden of the Jura purchased a total of over 7 million shares, partially exploiting their forests to fund them.
 
The Jura bernois began construction and opened individual sections of its network between Biel, Convers (near La Chaux-de-Fonds), Delle and Basel between 1872 and 30 March 1877. It complemented its network through acquisitions. The JB bought the bankrupt Jura industriel (JI) for CHF 3.6 million on 1 May 1875 and the Chemin de fer Porrentruy–Delle (PD) for CHF 1.99 million on 16 August 1876. It took over the Bernese State Railway (Bernische Staatsbahn, BSB), including the Zollikofen–Biel –La Neuveville line in 1877. The canton of Bern received JB shares worth CHF 11.56 million in return.
 
The JB was built during the railway construction boom after 1872 and interest rates and construction prices rose sharply. The recession of 1876 and the subsequent "railway crisis" almost bankrupted even the financially solid Swiss Northeastern Railway (Schweizerische Nordostbahn, NOB). Against this background, the consistent profits of the JB were unusual. The revenue from freight was higher than the revenue from passengers in each year from 1878.

Jura–Bern–Lucerne 

 
For the start of the operations of the Bern-Lucerne Railway Company (Bern-Luzern-Bahn, BLB) in 1875, the BLB and the Bernese Jura formed a joint operating company called the Jura–Bern–Luzern (Lucerne). This company continued to exist even after the bankruptcy of the BLB and, as of 1 July 1882, the JB leased the line from Bern to Lucerne, which now belonged to the canton of Bern. Thus, the Bernese Jura came into possession of the continuous Delle–Bern–Lucerne line, which connected with the Gotthard Railway. This route competed with the route of the Swiss Central Railway (Centralbahn) via , which lost direct access to the railway from Basel to France after the Franco-Prussian War. The extended route network prompted the railway to change its name to the Jura–Bern–Luzern (JBL).
 
Ten years after its construction, the Canton of Neuchâtel exercised its buyback right and acquired the Neuchâtel–La Chaux-de-Fonds–Le Locle line on 1 January 1886 for around CHF 5 million, so it could lease it to the newly established Jura neuchâtelois (JN). However, the JN could not earn enough to pay its rent, which made support by the public sector necessary.
 
The Jura–Bern–Luzern built the Brünig Railway from 25 August 1886. The extension from Alpnachstad to Lucerne followed on 1 June 1889. The metre-gauge line with sections of rack connects the two tourist regions of Central Switzerland and the Bernese Highlands. In addition, it was considered to have great military importance.
 
The Jura–Bern–Luzern also took care of the operation of the Bödelibahn (Bödeli Railway, BB) Därligen–Interlaken–Bönigen opened in 1872.

Merger into the Jura–Simplon Railway 
On 1 January 1890, the Jura–Bern–Luzern including the Gümligen–Lucerne line, which was owned by the canton of Bern, and the Western Swiss Railways (Suisse-Occidentale–Simplon, SOS) merged to form the Jura–Simplon Railways (Chemins de fer du Jura-Simplon, JS). From this point on it was the largest Swiss railway company; it was partly owned by the Swiss Confederation as a result of the purchase of shares on the market. On 1 January 1891, the JS took over the operations of the Pont–Vallorbe Railway (Chemin de fer Pont–Vallorbe, PV). Only the JS had sufficient resources to progress on the construction of the Simplon Tunnel that had been planned for decades.
 
The bridge over the Birs built by Gustave Eiffel for the Bernese Jura collapsed shortly after the merger. The Münchenstein rail disaster on 14 June 1891 was the largest railway disaster in Switzerland to that time.

Graphical summary 
Bwlow is an overview of the history of the Jura bernois and the Jura–Bern–Luzern (O: opening;   T: takeover):

Route network

Rolling stock
The locomotives from the beginning were designated as class A for express-tank locomotives, B for locomotives of "Bourbonnais" design (referring to the Compagnie du chemin de fer de paris à Lyon par le Bourbonnais, a predecessor company of the PLM, which developed the design) for passenger trains on mountain lines and freight trains on valley routes, C for freight locomotives, D for pilot tender locomotives and E for shunters. The locomotives were designated according to the uniform system used throughout Switzerland from 1887.

The following locomotives were available to the Jura–Bern–Lucerne. The class designation valid from 1902 is listed in brackets.

References

Notes

Footnotes

Sources
 
 
 
 
 
 
 
 

Defunct railway companies of Switzerland
Swiss companies established in 1874
1890 disestablishments in Switzerland
Railway companies established in 1874
Railway companies disestablished in 1890